Gibberula insularum is a species of sea snail, a marine gastropod mollusk, in the family Cystiscidae.

Distribution
This species occurs in Galapagos.

References

insularum
Gastropods described in 1971
Cystiscidae